Yorrie Evans (16 April 1923 – November 2003) was a British weightlifter. He competed in the men's lightweight event at the 1952 Summer Olympics.

References

1923 births
2003 deaths
British male weightlifters
Olympic weightlifters of Great Britain
Weightlifters at the 1952 Summer Olympics
Place of birth missing
20th-century British people